Kapka can refer to:

People
 Zdzisław Kapka (born 1954), Polish football player
 Kapka Georgieva (born 1951), Bulgarian rower
 Kapka Kassabova (born 1973), Bulgarian poet and writer
 Bojan Miladinović, nicknamed "Kapka" (born 1982), Serbian footballer

Other
 Kapka Lake, South Shetland Islands
 Kapka Tash Lake, Kyrgyzstan

See also
 Kapkan (disambiguation)
 Kappa (disambiguation)
 Kopka (disambiguation)